Edwin R. Elbel (November 24, 1895 – July 5, 1983) was an American football coach and university professor.  He was the tenth head football at Ottawa University in Ottawa, Kansas, serving five seasons, from 1923 to 1927, compiling a record of 14–21–7.

Elbel received a bachelor's degree from Springfield College in 1920 and a second bachelor's from Ottawa in 1925. He later returned to Springfield College and was awarded a master's degree in 1928. The University of Iowa awarded him a Doctor of Philosophy in 1938. In 1928, Elbel joined the faculty at the University of Kansas in the Department of Physical Education and reached full professor status in 1946. He retired in 1966 and died in 1983.

While at the University of Kansas, he kept meticulous records on the height and weight of college students, as well as completing a study of response time before and after exercise.

Head coaching record

Football

References

External links
 Personal Papers  University of Kansas Library
 

1895 births
1983 deaths
Ottawa Braves basketball coaches
Ottawa Braves football coaches
Ottawa University alumni
University of Iowa alumni
University of Kansas faculty